Darren Morgan (born 3 May 1966) is a Welsh former professional snooker player who now competes as an amateur.

Morgan won the World Amateur Championship in 1987 and played on the professional main tour from 1988 until 2006. He earned just over £1 million in prize money, reached a high ranking of eight, and was ranked within the top 16 for six years despite never winning a ranking event. He compiled 111  in his career.

Career
Morgan was born in Newport, South Wales.

His best achievements as a professional were to win the Irish Masters in 1996, beating Steve Davis 9–8 in the final, and he captained Wales to victory in the 1999 Nations Cup. He was also a semi-finalist in the 1994 World Championship, beating Mark King 10–5, Willie Thorne 13–12 and John Parrott 13–11 before losing to Jimmy White 9–16. He was also a quarter-finalist on three occasions, beating Ken Doherty and Ronnie O'Sullivan in 1996 and 1997 respectively at the Crucible. When he beat O'Sullivan in 1997 it was in the round after O'Sullivan had scored his memorable 5 minute and 8 seconds 147 break against Mick Price.

Morgan still plays in amateur and pro-am events, and won the EBSA Masters and World Masters Championship titles in 2007. On 22 October 2009 he won the TCC Pro-Am by beating fellow Welshman Mark Williams 7–4 in the final.

On 23 November 2009 Morgan won his second IBSF World Snooker Championship in the Masters section, defeating three-time defending champion Dene O'Kane of New Zealand 6–0 in the final.

Morgan entered the World Open 2010 as an amateur along with fellow senior Tony Knowles and caused an upset by reaching the last 64 of the competition, before narrowly losing to former world number four Matthew Stevens 3–2 in round three.

In November 2011, he entered the World Seniors Championships in Peterborough and came away with victory over Steve Davis in the final. Morgan beat former world champion Cliff Thorburn and 'Whirlwind' Jimmy White in the previous rounds before facing the six-times world champion in the final. In fact, Morgan had to win qualifying matches just to reach the final stages of the tournament. He beat Davis 2–1 in the final and came home to his Club in Cross Keys with the trophy.

In June 2016, as a wildcard entry to the Riga Masters having won the EBSA European Open title several weeks prior, Morgan overcame Bradley Jones 4–3, Adam Stefanow 4–2, Zhao Xintong 4–1, Doherty 4–3 and Xiao Guodong 4–2 to set up a semi-final encounter with Neil Robertson. Appearing at this stage of a ranking event for the first time since 2002, and becoming the oldest ranking semi-finalist since Rex Williams in 1986, Morgan was whitewashed 5–0 by the eventual champion.

Morgan made a maximum break of 147 against Gareth Edwards in an amateur Seniors event in 2023; this possibly makes him the oldest player to achieve a maximum break in competition.

Personal life
He lives with his wife, Tracy, and their three daughters in Newbridge, and owns a nearby snooker club in Crosskeys, Newport, named The Red Triangle, where he coaches young players.

Performance and rankings timeline

Career finals

Ranking finals: 2

Non-ranking finals:15 (8 titles)

Team finals: 2 (1 title)

Pro-am finals: 7 (2 titles)

Amateur finals: 34 (28 titles)

References

External links

Morgan Sports – Darren's Sports Trophy Business
Player profile on Global Snooker

1966 births
Living people
Welsh snooker players
Sportspeople from Newport, Wales
World champions in snooker